Édouard Bourdet (Saint-Germain-en-Laye, 26 October 1887 – Paris, 17 January 1945) was a 20th-century French playwright.

He was married to the poet, Catherine Pozzi; their son was Claude Bourdet.

Plays
1910: Le Rubicon
1912: La Cage ouverte, Théâtre Michel
1922: L'Heure du berger  
1923: L'Homme enchaîné, play in 3 acts, Théâtre Fémina, 7 Novembre
1926: La Prisonnière, presented in London, New York and Vienna
1927: Vient de paraître, comedy in 4 acts, Théâtre de la Michodière, 25 November
1929: Le Sexe faible, comedy in 3 acts  which ran for nearly two years at the Théâtre de la Michodière, 10 December, and was also presented in Berlin
1932: La Fleur des pois, comedy in 4 acts, Théâtre de la Michodière, 4 October
1934: Les Temps difficiles, play in 4 acts, Théâtre de la Michodière, 30 January, revived at the Théâtre du Vieux-Colombier (Comédie-Française) from 22 November to 30 December 2006, arranged by Jean-Claude Berruti
1935: Margot, play in 2 acts, Théâtre Marigny, 26 November, with Pierre Fresnay, Jacques Dumesnil and Yvonne Printemps. Mise en scène was Pierre Fresnay's and the incidental music by Georges Auric and Francis Poulenc
1936: Fric-Frac, play in 5 acts, Théâtre de la Michodière, 15 October
1941: Hyménée, play in 4 acts, Théâtre de la Michodière, 7 May
1942: Père, Théâtre de la Michodière, 15 December

Theatre director 
1938: Le Vieil Homme by Georges de Porto-Riche, Comédie-Française

Filmography 
1933 : The Weaker Sex by Robert Siodmak, screenplay and dialogue after his play.

Further reading

Theses

Bibliography 
 Denise Bourdet, Édouard Bourdet et ses amis, Jeune Parque, 1963
 Roger Bordier, Édouard Bourdet ou le théâtre du défi, Les Éditions de l'Amandier, 2006
 Bruno Tessarech, Villa blanche - A la recherche du temps perdu, Buchet Chastel, 2005

Archival Sources
Ellen Van Volkenburg-Maurice Browne general correspondence, 1911- (ca. 5 linear feet) are housed in the University of Michigan Special Collections Library.  Contain correspondence with Édouard Bourdet.
Alexander Berkman Papers, 1892-1936 (4.05 meters) are held in the International Institute of Social History. Contain correspondence with Édouard Bourdet

References

People from Saint-Germain-en-Laye
1887 births
1945 deaths
20th-century French dramatists and playwrights
20th-century French journalists
Administrators of the Comédie-Française
Troupe of the Comédie-Française
Burials at Passy Cemetery